W. Louis Coppersmith (June 19, 1928 – January 15, 1989) was a member of the Pennsylvania State Senate, serving from 1969 to 1980. He and fellow Senator Quentin Orlando were the main sponsors of the "Diagnostic Drug Bill."

References

Democratic Party Pennsylvania state senators
1928 births
1989 deaths
20th-century American politicians